IET Software is a peer-reviewed scientific journal on software engineering and related issues, published by the Institution of Engineering and Technology (IET) in the United Kingdom.

The journal was previously published under the following titles:

 Software & Microsystems (1982–1986, Online , Print )
 Software Engineering Journal (1986–1996, Online , Print )
  IEE Proceedings - Software (1997–2006. Online , Print )

The journal is listed on the online IEEE Xplore Digital Library. It is indexed by DBLP, EBSCO, Ei Compendex, IET Inspec, ProQuest, Science Citation Index Expanded (SCI-E), SCImago, and Scopus.

See also
 IEEE Software magazine
 IEEE Transactions on Software Engineering journal

References

External links 
 IET Software home page

2007 establishments in the United Kingdom
Bimonthly journals
Computer science in the United Kingdom
Computer science journals
English-language journals
Institution of Engineering and Technology academic journals
Publications established in 2007
Software engineering publications